There Will Come Soft Rains may refer to:

 "There Will Come Soft Rains" (poem), by Sara Teasdale
 "There Will Come Soft Rains" (short story), by Ray Bradbury